Hydrangea chinensis is a species of flowering plant in the family Hydrangeaceae, native to Myanmar, southeast China, and Taiwan.

Subtaxa
The following varieties are accepted:
Hydrangea chinensis var. chinensis
Hydrangea chinensis var. lobbii (Maxim.) Kitam. – Philippines, Taiwan
Hydrangea chinensis var. yayeyamensis (Koidz.) T.Yamaz. – Ryukyu Islands

References

chinensis
Flora of Myanmar
Flora of Southeast China
Flora of Taiwan